= L'Affranchissement =

Belgian rationalist association

L'Affranchissement was a rationalist free-thinking association in Belgium, founded in Brussels in 1854. The founding of the association was assisted by political exiles from France. L'Affranchissement was the first organization of its kind in the country. It recruited its followers from artisans, intellectuals and the lower middle classes. The legacy of L'Affranchissement would play an important role in shaping the early Belgian labour movement.

The workers cooperative organizer Jan Pellering was one of the founders of the association. Pellering would also serve as the editor of the organ of the association, Le Prolétaire.

The association was divided into two tendencies; one which wanted to concentrate on social studies (believing that studies of social phenomena in itself would contribute to social change) and another that wished to set up mutual aid schemes and cooperatives. A split emerged, and another rationalist organization called Les Solidaires was founded in 1857. Les Solidaires was more working class-based socialist in its orientation than the parent organization.

In 1863 bourgeois liberals broke away from the association, and formed the group Libre pensée. After this split the association drew followers mainly from workers' groups. Within the association an anarchist nucleus emerged, and overall the association was perceived as the most revolutionary grouping in the country at the time. Many members of the association declared themselves as atheists. By 1877 several members began adopting Marxist thoughts, a shift that resulted in yet another split.

L'Affranchissement was dissolved around the turn of the century, and replaced by the National Federation of Free-Thinking Societies.
